Knorpp is an unincorporated community in Jefferson County, in the U.S. state of Missouri.

History
A post office called Knorpp was established in 1890, and remained in operation until 1914. C. F. Knorpp, an early postmaster, gave the community his last name.

References

Unincorporated communities in Jefferson County, Missouri
Unincorporated communities in Missouri